Kilwinning East railway station was a railway station serving the town of Kilwinning, North Ayrshire, Scotland as part of the Lanarkshire and Ayrshire Railway.

History

The station opened on 3 September 1888 and was simply known as Kilwinning. It closed between 1 January 1917 and 1 February 1919 due to wartime economy, and upon the grouping of the L&AR into the London, Midland and Scottish Railway in 1923, the station was renamed Kilwinning East on 2 June 1924.  The station closed permanently to regular passenger traffic on 4 July 1932.

Today there is no trace of this station, and the site is occupied by Caley House (named after L&AR owners Caledonian Railway) and the Cornerstone Church.  Garnock Viaduct at the extreme north of the town is the only physical reminder that Kilwinning was once served by this line.

References

Notes

Sources 
 
 Views of Kilwinning. 1910. Pub. Mrs. Brotherston, Kilwinning.

Disused railway stations in North Ayrshire
Railway stations in Great Britain opened in 1888
Railway stations in Great Britain closed in 1917
Railway stations in Great Britain opened in 1919
Railway stations in Great Britain closed in 1932
Former Caledonian Railway stations